Studio Dragon Corporation is a South Korean drama production, marketing and distribution company under CJ ENM's Entertainment Division. It was established on May 3, 2016, as a spin-off from E&M drama division.In 2018, Studio Dragon became a subsidiaries of CJ ENM after their previous parent company CJ E&M was merged into CJ ENM.

The company joined the KOSDAQ index of Korea Exchange, the same index where its parent company is listed, through an initial public offering on November 24, 2017.

Studio Dragon has partnered with Netflix to carry dozen of tvN dramas like Crash Landing on You and It's Okay to Not Be Okay to the platform. Their partnership would expect to be expired on 2022 as CJ ENM, founder of Studio Dragon, has decided to focus on TVING following the merger with KT Seezn, which also owned minority shares on KT StudioGenie, who founded the streaming platform .

Logo
Studio Dragon's logo, which it calls the "Drama Paragon", was inspired by Cintamani, a wish-fulfilling jewel within both Hindu and 
Buddhist traditions. It represents Asian culture, which the company wants to glorify through every production it makes. The logo, made by Korean brand design company BRANDMAJOR, was first introduced in the 2016 drama Squad 38.

Production works

As production company

As planner/creator/developer

Current managed people
According to company CEO Jinnie Choi, as of November 2017 Studio Dragon managed 133 directors and writers under its different subsidiaries and affiliates.

Actors

Culture Depot
 Han Dong-ho

JS Pictures
 Lee Da-hae
 Yoon Hyun-min
 Lee Seung-joon
 Ahn Woo-yeon
 Park Eun-seok
 So Hee-jung
 Kim Min-young
  
 Jeon Ye-seo
 
 
 Park Seo-yeon
 Kim-bit Na-ri
 Geum Chae-an
 Cha Yeon-woo

Directors

Studio Dragon
 Kim Won-seok
 Lee Na-jung
 
 
 Park Hong-kyun

JS Pictures
 
 
 Kim Byungsoo
 
 
 Ahn Pan-seok
 Lee Min-woo
 Lee Jong-jae
 Lee Chang-han
 
  (founder/CEO)

Mega Monster
 Kim Jung-min

Scriptwriters

Culture Depot
 Park Ji-eun

Hwa&Dam Pictures
 Kim Eun-sook

KPJ
 Kim Young-hyun

JS Pictures
 Kim Hyun-hee
 Kim Jung-eun
 
 Baek Mi-kyung
 Yang Jin-ah
 Lee Ji-hyo
 Lee Jin-mae
 Go Jung-won
 Jung Ha-na

AStory
 Kim Eun-hee

Mega Monster
 Jo Eun-jung
 
 Yoon Sung-hee
 Do Hyun-jung
 Kang Sung-jin
 Nam Sang-wook

Formerly managed people

Actors

Culture Depot
 Park Min-young
 Jo Jung-suk
 Ko So-young
 Claudia Kim
 Jun Ji-hyun
 Seo Ji-hye
 Yoon Ji-on
 Yoon Ji-min
 Kim So-hyun

JS Pictures
 Yoon So-yi
 
 Son Hyo-eun

Related companies

Subsidiaries
 Culture Depot (CEO: Kim Sun-jung)
 Hwa&Dam Pictures (CEO: Yoon Ha-rim)
 KPJ Corporation (CEO: Jang Jin-wook)

Joint ventures
 Mega Monster (with kakao M) (CEO: Lee Jun-ho)

Affiliate companies
 AStory (CEO: Lee Sang-baek)
 JS Pictures (CEO: Lee Jin-suk)

Partner entities
 DramaFever
 LOEN Entertainment
 Amazon.com
 Netflix
 AMC Networks
 ITV
 Lazada Group

Special projects
 O'PEN (with CJ ENM, CJ Entertainment, and CJ Cultural Foundation)

Notes

References

External links
   
 Studio Dragon's profile at CJ E&M's website 
 

 
2016 establishments in South Korea
CJ Group subsidiaries
Mass media companies established in 2016
Television production companies of South Korea
Companies based in Seoul
Corporate spin-offs
Companies listed on KOSDAQ
2017 initial public offerings